A deer rub describes the abrasions caused by a male deer rubbing his forehead and antlers against the base of a tree. Easy to spot in areas with high deer populations, hunters use them to find ideal locations for hunting. They appear in the late summer or early fall, when male deer rub the velvet off their newly acquired antler growth or during rut season. The area between the forehead and antlers contains a large number of apocrine sweat glands, and leave a scent that communicates a challenge to other male deer while also attracting potential mates.  The size of the rub usually varies with the size of the deer.

References

Deer hunting